Coe is an unincorporated community in Nicholas County, West Virginia, United States.

The community was named after George T. Coe, the original owner of the town site. The Laurel Run Rockshelter was listed on the National Register of Historic Places in 1993.

References

Unincorporated communities in Nicholas County, West Virginia
Unincorporated communities in West Virginia